The Loyalists may refer to:

 Loyalists, those showing allegiance to the British crown
 The Loyalists: An Historical Novel, an 1812 novel by Jane West

See also
 Loyalist (disambiguation)